Bussy Mansel, 4th Baron Mansel (sometimes spelled Mansell) (died 29 November 1750) was a Welsh peer.

He succeeded his brother Christopher Mansel as Baron Mansel of Margam (or "Margram") in 1744.

Bussy Mansel married Lady Elizabeth Hervey, the daughter of John Hervey, 1st Earl of Bristol, and sister of John Hervey, 2nd Baron Hervey, on 17 May 1724.  On 13 March 1729, he married Barbara Villiers, daughter of William Villiers, 2nd Earl of Jersey; she survived him. He had one daughter by his second marriage, Louisa Barbarina Mansel (2 February 1733 – 16 February 1786), who married George Venables-Vernon, 2nd Baron Vernon, on 16 July 1757. Louisa had no children, and the Margam estate ultimately passed to Bussy's sister Mary.

References

Sources
thepeerage.com

Year of birth unknown
1750 deaths
4
Members of the Parliament of Great Britain for Welsh constituencies
British MPs 1727–1734
British MPs 1734–1741
British MPs 1741–1747